The Eritrea women's national football team is the representative women's association football team of Eritrea. Its governing body is the Eritrean National Football Federation (ENFF) and it competes as a member of the Confederation of African Football (CAF).

The national team's first activity was in 2002, when they entered the 2002 African Women's Championship qualification. being to draw to face Tanzania on two-legged matches. On the 10th of August 2002, Eritrea played their first match against Tanzania losing two to three goals, the team performance improved as they drew Tanzania in the 2nd leg. Burkina Faso is currently unranked in the FIFA Women's World Rankings after being inactive for more than 18 months. Eritrea played the majority of its matches against Tanzania.

Record per opponent
Key

The following table shows Eritrea' all-time official international record per opponent:

Results

2002

2004

2006

2007

2010

2021

See also
 Eritrea national football team results

References

External links
 Eritrea results on The Roon Ba
  Eritrea results on Globalsports
 Eritrea results on worldfootball.net
 Eritrea results on SoccerWay

2010s in Eritrea
2020s in Eritrea
Women's national association football team results